Countess Karoline Ernestine of Erbach-Schönberg, born 20 August 1727 (20 July, according to other sources) at Gedern, Oberhessen, Hesse-Darmstadt, in the then Holy Roman Empire, was a daughter of George August, Count of Erbach-Schönberg, and Ferdinande Henriette, Countess of Stolberg-Gedern. She died at Ebersdorf, Thuringia, on 22 April 1796, at age 68.

Through her daughter Augusta, she was the great-grandmother of Queen Victoria of the United Kingdom.

Family
She married Heinrich XXIV, Count Reuss of Ebersdorf, on 28 June 1754 at Thurnau, Bavaria, and had seven children, all of them born at Ebersdorf, Reuss-Jüngere-Linie, Thüringia.

Ancestry

House of Erbach-Schönberg
German princesses
1727 births
1796 deaths
People from Gedern
House of Reuss
Princesses of Reuss